Alexander of Aegae was a Peripatetic philosopher who flourished in Rome in the 1st century AD, and was a disciple of the celebrated mathematician Sosigenes of Alexandria. 
He was tutor to the emperor Nero. He wrote commentaries on the Categories and the De Caelo of Aristotle. He had a son named Caelinus or Caecilius.
Attempts in the 19th century to ascribe some of the works of Alexander of Aphrodisias to Alexander of Aegae have been shown to be mistaken.

References

Sources

1st-century philosophers
Roman-era philosophers in Rome
Commentators on Aristotle
Roman-era Peripatetic philosophers